The 1991–92 NBA season was the Bullets' 31st season in the National Basketball Association. During the off-season, the Bullets re-acquired Michael Adams from the Denver Nuggets, and signed free agents; David Wingate, and undrafted rookie forward Larry Stewart. However, Bernard King would miss the entire season with a right knee injury. To make matters worse, Hot Plate Williams was suspended for the entire season due to weight problems. The Bullets endured prolonged losing streaks in almost every month, as they traded Tom Hammonds midway through the season to the Charlotte Hornets in exchange for Rex Chapman, who only played in the final game of the season due a strained plantar fascia (left heel) injury. The Bullets lost 15 of their final 18 games, finishing sixth in the Atlantic Division with a 25–57 record.

Pervis Ellison showed improvement averaging 20.0 points, 11.2 rebounds and 2.7 blocks per game, and was named Most Improved Player of the Year, while Adams averaged 18.1 points, 7.6 assists and 1.9 steals per game, and was selected for the 1992 NBA All-Star Game. In addition, Harvey Grant provided the team with 18.0 points and 6.8 rebounds per game, while Ledell Eackles contributed 13.2 points per game, second-year guard A.J. English provided with 10.9 points per game off the bench, and Wingate contributed 7.9 points and 1.5 steals per game. Stewart averaged 10.4 points and 5.9 rebounds per game, and became the first undrafted player to make an NBA All-Rookie Team, being selected to the All-Rookie Second Team. 

Following the season, Williams signed as a free agent with the Los Angeles Clippers, while Wingate signed with the Charlotte Hornets during the next season, and English was released to free agency.

Draft picks

Roster

Roster Notes
 Forward Mark Alarie missed the entire season due to a knee injury.
 Forward Bernard King missed the entire season due to a right knee injury.
 Forward John "Hot Plate" Williams was suspended indefinitely due to weight problems, and not maintaining playing shape.

Regular season

Season standings

y - clinched division title
x - clinched playoff spot

z - clinched division title
y - clinched division title
x - clinched playoff spot

Record vs. opponents

Game log

Player statistics

Awards and Records
 Pervis Ellison, NBA Most Improved Player Award
 Larry Stewart, NBA All-Rookie Team 2nd Team

Transactions

See also
 1991–92 NBA season

References

Washington Wizards seasons
Wash
Wiz
Wiz